Byron Dwight Houston (born November 22, 1969) is an American former professional basketball player. A 6'5", 250-pound power forward, he played collegiately for Oklahoma State University and was selected by the Chicago Bulls in the first round (27th pick overall) of the 1992 NBA draft. In an National Basketball Association (NBA) career that lasted four seasons, Houston played for the Golden State Warriors, Seattle SuperSonics and Sacramento Kings. He then played in the PBA in 1997. Houston played for the Quad City Thunder of the Continental Basketball Association (CBA) and was selected as the CBA Finals Most Valuable Player in 1998.

Personal life 
Houston's biological father is former NBA player Curtis Perry.

Controversies
In June 2006, Houston was removed from a children's basketball camp in Oklahoma because he pleaded guilty in March 2003 to four counts of
indecent exposure and was registered as a sex offender in that state for the next ten years.
On June 13, 2007, Houston was arrested on counts of indecent exposure, engaging in a lewd act and driving with a canceled license. On September 16, 2007, he was sentenced to four years in prison for violating probation stemming from this offense. Defense witnesses have claimed that Houston suffers from bipolar disorder and other conditions such as post traumatic stress disorder as a result of suffering extreme abuse as a child.

See also
List of NCAA Division I men's basketball players with 2000 points and 1000 rebounds
List of NCAA Division I men's basketball career free throw scoring leaders

References

External links
Stats at Basketball-Reference
ESPN.com profile

1969 births
Living people
20th-century African-American sportspeople
21st-century African-American people
African-American basketball players
All-American college men's basketball players
American expatriate basketball people in Poland
American expatriate basketball people in Russia
American expatriate basketball people in Spain
American expatriate basketball people in the Philippines
American men's basketball players
American sex offenders
American sportspeople convicted of crimes
Asseco Gdynia players
Baloncesto León players
Basketball players at the 1999 Pan American Games
Basketball players from Oklahoma
Chicago Bulls draft picks
Golden State Warriors players
Liga ACB players
Medalists at the 1999 Pan American Games
Oklahoma State Cowboys basketball players
Pan American Games medalists in basketball
Pan American Games silver medalists for the United States
People from Watonga, Oklahoma
People convicted of sex crimes
People with bipolar disorder
Philippine Basketball Association imports
Pop Cola Panthers players
Power forwards (basketball)
Quad City Thunder players
Sacramento Kings players
Seattle SuperSonics players
St. Louis Swarm players